Club Deportivo Idoya is a Spanish football team based in Oteiza in the autonomous community of Navarre. Founded in 1949, it plays in 3ª - Group 15. Its stadium is Estadio Iturtxipia with a capacity of 1,000 seaters.

Season to season

8 seasons in Tercera División

External links
Futbolme team profile  
CD Idoya on Futnavarra.es 

Football clubs in Navarre
Association football clubs established in 1949
1949 establishments in Spain